Elachista beorella is a moth of the family Elachistidae. It is found in Canada, where it has been recorded from Newfoundland.

References

beorella
Moths described in 1999
Moths of North America
Endemic fauna of Canada
Endemic fauna of Newfoundland and Labrador
Organisms named after Tolkien and his works